Du Yu (223– January or February 285), courtesy name Yuankai, was a Chinese classicist, military general, and politician of the state of Cao Wei during the late Three Kingdoms period and early Jin dynasty.

Life
Du Yu was from Duling County, Jingzhao Commandery, which is located northwest of present-day Xi'an, Shaanxi. He married Princess Gaolu, a sister of Sima Zhao, the regent of the Cao Wei state from 255 to 263 and the father of Sima Yan (Emperor Wu), later the first emperor of the Jin dynasty (266–420).

A prolific author, Du Yu was a self-proclaimed addict of the Zuo Zhuan and wrote an influential commentary to it. He was one of the most important commanders under the Wei general Zhong Hui during the conquest of Wei's rival state, Shu. He also followed in leading an army in the Jin dynasty's conquest of the state of Eastern Wu. Du Yu managed to lay waste to the Wu army with great force in not the greatest of length of time, and received the surrender of Sun Hao, the last Wu emperor. His military achievements were all the more remarkable due to his physical weaknesses; it was recorded that he was unable to ride a horse or shoot an arrow with significant force.

Du Yu was also an ancestor of the Tang dynasty poet Du Fu, and his grandfather Du Shenyan. Unlike his predecessors, Du Yu used the Zuo Zhuan to comment on the Chunqiu Classic. He therefore combined the two books in one, which has been the common practice since.

See also
 Lists of people of the Three Kingdoms

References

 Chen, Shou (3rd century). Records of the Three Kingdoms (Sanguozhi).
 Fang, Xuanling (ed.) (648). Book of Jin (Jin Shu).
 
 Pei, Songzhi (5th century). Annotations to Records of the Three Kingdoms (Sanguozhi zhu).

222 births
285 deaths
Chinese classicists
Chinese Confucianists
Cao Wei generals
Du clan of Jingzhao
Historians from Shaanxi
Jin dynasty (266–420) generals
Jin dynasty (266–420) historians
Jin dynasty (266–420) politicians
Mayors of Luoyang